Jalan Arau, Federal Route 176 (formerly Perlis state route R15 and Kedah state route K3), is a federal road in Perlis and Kedah state, Malaysia.

Features
At most sections, the Federal Route 176 was built under the JKR R5 road standard, with a speed limit of 90 km/h.

List of junctions

References

Malaysian Federal Roads
Roads in Kedah
Roads in Perlis